Sands Macao is a hotel and casino resort located in Sé, Macau, SAR - China. It is owned and operated by the Las Vegas Sands Corporation, and was designed by Steelman Partners, LLP.  It comprises a  casino, and a 289-suite hotel.

Las Vegas Sands chairman Sheldon Adelson has said that his company will soon be a mainly Chinese enterprise, and that Las Vegas should be called "America's Macau".  The president and chief operating officer of Las Vegas Sands Corporation predicted on February 12, 2007 that Macau's gaming revenue has topped that of the Las Vegas Strip and will more than double again by 2010.

History

The casino opened on May 18, 2004 at a cost of $240 million. All of the mortgage bonds that were issued to finance construction were paid off in May 2005.

A new hotel tower opened in late 2007, bringing the property's total room count to 289.

See also

 Gambling in Macau

References

External links

Casinos completed in 2004
Resorts in Macau
Hotel buildings completed in 2004
Casinos in Macau
2004 establishments in Macau
Sheldon Adelson